Kada Kechamli (born January 12, 1978 in Oran) is an Algerian football player. He currently plays for MC Oran in the Algerian Ligue Professionnelle 1.

Honours
 Won the Arab Cup Winners' Cup twice with MC Oran in 1997 and 1998
 Won the Arab Super Cup once with MC Oran in 1999
 Finalist of the Algerian Cup twice with MC Oran in 1998 and 2002
 Finalist of the Algerian League Cup once with MC Oran in 2000
 Finalist of the Arab Champions League once with MC Oran in 2001

External links
 DZFoot Profile
 

1978 births
Living people
Footballers from Oran
Algerian footballers
Algerian Ligue Professionnelle 1 players
ASO Chlef players
MC Oran players
Association football defenders
21st-century Algerian people